USA-315, also known as SBIRS GEO-5, is a military satellite developed as a part of the Space-Based Infrared System. The satellite aims to increase the capabilities of the United States Department of Defense in terms of missile defense and military intelligence.

Overview 
As a part of the SBIRS program, the successor of Defense Support Program (DSP), new satellites with better features were planned to be launched and used by United States Air Force and Space Force.  USA-315, like other satellites in SBIRS program, is used for early warning.

The initial work contract for SBIRS GEO-5 and SBIRS GEO-6 was awarded to Lockheed Martin in October 2012. After two years, Lockheed Martin was awarded again in 2014, but this time with a manufacturing contract.

SBIRS GEO-5 is built on an LM 2100 Combat Bus and the development phase took more than five years.

On 18 May 2021, SBIRS GEO-5 (USA-315) was launched from Cape Canaveral Space Force Station, Florida.

The satellite was accepted by the U.S. Space Force and showed %40 improvement in average testing times.

References 

Missile defense
Early warning systems
Military space program of the United States
Early warning satellites
Military equipment introduced in the 2000s